Nižný Hrabovec (earlier i.a.: Slovak Nižssí Hrabowec/Hungarian Alsóhrabóc) is a village and municipality in the Vranov nad Topľou District in the Prešov Region of Slovakia.

References

External links
 
 

Villages and municipalities in Vranov nad Topľou District
Zemplín (region)